ALZhIR, the Akmolinsk Camp of Wives of Traitors to the Motherland (Russian: Акмолинский лагерь жён изменников Родины (А. Л. Ж. И. Р.) was a Gulag in the Akmola Region of Kazakhstan. It was instituted by the Soviet Union to jail the ChSIR: members of the families of traitors to the Motherland after NKVD Order 00486 of 15 August 1937. Over 18,000 women were imprisoned at the camp in various years, and about 8,000 women served a full sentence at ALZhIR. Today, the camp houses a museum-memorial complex of victims of political repression and totalitarianism, which opened on 31 May 2007 as part of an initiative of President Nursultan Nazarbayev. After the closure of the prisons in 1953, it was reported that 1,507 of the women gave birth as a result of being raped by the guards.

References

External links
 Article at Atlas Obscure

Camps of the Gulag